This is a list of notable Nigerian musical groups. For individual musicians, see List of Nigerian musicians.

B
Bracket
Bantu

F
The Funkees

L
Lijadu Sisters

P
P-Square
Plantashun Boiz
Port Harcourt Male Ensemble

R
Christian Rich
The Remedies
Rex Jim Lawson

S
Skuki
Styl-Plus
SHiiKANE

T
Trybesmen
Twins Affair

W
Wunmi

See also

:Category:Nigerian musical groups
:Category:Nigerian record labels
:Category:Music festivals in Nigeria

 
Musical groups
Groups